James Lee Guy (born 1968) is an American actor in film and television in China known in front of the camera by his stage name Gai Ji Li, meaning "very lucky". His name was given to him by his Chinese wife.  

Guy is a native of Paragon, Indiana and married his wife Helen, a Chinese national when they were both students at IUPUI staying at International House of Indiana University. In 2007, he left a real estate job to focus on his career an actor. He has since worked with veteran Chinese actors Masser and Li Wen Bo to become a foreign lead actor in China.

Living in Beijing with his wife and two sons, Guy teaches his sons acting. In 2010 Guy had a cameo role as a priest in the movie Li Jia Da Yuan in which his eldest son, Alexander, won a lead role as Jerry Li.

Filmography
The Bodyguard (2016 film) 2016
Dragon Blade (film) 2015
1911 辛亥革命 2011
 The Big Layout 大格局 2011
Qian Xue Sen 钱学森 2011
Yima 义马 2011
The Tibetan Body Guard 藏客 2010
Lee Family Courtyard 李家大院 2010
The 38th Parallel穿越三八线 1999

Television series

The Trial of Yang Nai Wu Yu Xiao Bai Cai 杨乃武与小白菜冤案 2011
Han Yang Zao 汉阳造 2011
Lian Hua 莲花 2011
Ju Hua Zui 菊花醉 2011
Huan Ying 幻影 2011
Qiang Pao Hou  2011
Knife Wars 尖刀战士 2010
Brother's Hero 兄弟英雄 2010
Shui Shang You Ji Dui 水上游击队 2010
Zhi Qing 知青 2010
Peking War and Peace 北平战与和 2009
The Song of the Ocean Tide 大潮如歌 2009
Youth Not Wasted 青春不言败 2009
The Eminent Clan 望族 2008
Spy Wars 密战 2008
Liberation 解放 2008
Yu Xue Jian Chi浴血坚持 2007
The Korean War 朝鲜战争 2001

References

1968 births
Living people
Male actors from Indiana
American expatriates in China